Cabinda, also known as Chioua, is a city and a municipality located in the Cabinda Province, an exclave of Angola. Angolan sovereignty over Cabinda is disputed by the secessionist Republic of Cabinda. The city of Cabinda had a population of 550,000 and the municipality a population of 624,646, at the 2014 Census. The residents of the city are known as Cabindas or Fiotes. Cabinda, due to its proximity to rich oil reserves, serves as one of Angola's main oil ports.

History
The city was founded by the Portuguese in 1883 after the signing of the Treaty of Simulambuco, in the same period as the Berlin Conference.
Cabinda was an embarkation point for slaves to Brazil.

There are considerable offshore oil reserves nearby.

Geography
Cabinda is located on the Atlantic Ocean coast in the south of Cabinda Province, and sits on the right bank of the Bele River.

According to the Köppen climate classification, Cabinda is a tropical savanna climate.

Districts
The city of Cabinda is divided into three districts, or comuna:

Cabinda, the city seat, with 88.6% of the population the city
Malembo, with 3.1%
Tando-Zinze, with 8.3%

Education and science 
Cabinda is home to two public higher education institutions, namely the 11 de Novembro University and the Higher Institute of Education Sciences of Cabinda.
In addition, it has campuses of the Lusíada University and the Private University of Angola.

Culture
The city's population has a distinctive culture from its way of dressing and eating to traditional rituals, especially Chicumbe and celebrated ceremonies of Bakamas do Tchizo, a traditional ritual that enables the interaction between the living and the occult spirits of the gods and the ancestors, thus ensuring the reconciliation between the dead and the living.

Language
Ibinda, a Bantu language, is the primary language of both the city and province of Cabinda. Portuguese, the official language of Angola, is also spoken, though mostly as an administrative role. Since Cabinda was colonized relatively later (late nineteenth century) by Portugal compared to most of Angola, Portuguese is not as widely spoken, though language speakers are rapidly growing in number.

Transport 

In 2012, a proposed railway connection to the main Angolan system has to cross territory of the Democratic Republic of the Congo.

Notable people 
Eduardo Camavinga (born 2002), French football player

See also
 Togolese national football team bus attack

References

Bibliography

External links

 Profile of Cabinda Municipality 
 

Provincial capitals in Angola
Populated places in Cabinda Province
Port cities and towns in Angola
Municipalities of Angola